Tage William-Olsson (8 June 1888 – 22 August 1960) was a Swedish architect and chief town planning architect of Gothenburg. He was one of the designers of the Slussen traffic-roundabout infrastructure-project built during  1935  in Stockholm.

Biography
Carl Martin Tage William-Olsson was born in London, England. His parents were Swedish  businessman William Olof Olsson (1862-1923) and his wife Maria Bergman (1862-1954).
His brother William Frits William-Olsson  (1902-1990) was a professor of Economic Geography at the Stockholm School of Economics.
In 1896, the family moved to Stockholm where his father founded the Lundsbergs boarding school (Lundsbergs skola).

William-Olsson attended the University of Sheffield 1906–1907. He graduated in engineering at KTH Royal Institute of Technology (1908). He took a job as metallurgist at AB Gröndals Patents in Stockholm.  In 1925 he started his own architectural firm which he had until 1930, when he became an employee of the city planning office in Stockholm. From 1935 to 1943, he had his own architectural firm in Stockholm. From 1943 to 1953, he was the city planning manager in Gothenburg.

In the 1930s, Lundborg proposed a design for the area of Slussenområdet  in central Stockholm. The planning commission for the  Slussen  construction project included architects Tage William-Olsson and  Holger Blom (1906- 1996), in collaboration city planning officials including engineer  Gösta Lundborg  (1883-1959).

References

Other sources
Eva Rudberg  (2004) Tage William-Olsson : stridbar planerare och visionär arkitekt ( Stockholmia förlag) 

Swedish architects
1888 births
1960 deaths
Alumni of the University of Sheffield
KTH Royal Institute of Technology alumni